The Weavers is a 1927 German silent historical drama film directed by Frederic Zelnik and starring Paul Wegener, Valeska Stock and Hermann Picha. The film is based on the 1892 play of the same title by Gerhart Hauptmann based on a historical event. The film's art direction was by Andrej Andrejew.

Synopsis
During the 1840s a group of Silesian weavers stage an uprising due to their concerns about the Industrial Revolution's impact of their lives.

Cast

References

Bibliography
Prawer, S.S. Between Two Worlds: The Jewish Presence in German and Austrian Film, 1910–1933. Berghahn Books, 2005.

External links

1927 films
Films of the Weimar Republic
German silent feature films
Films directed by Frederic Zelnik
Films set in Prussia
German films based on plays
Films based on works by Gerhart Hauptmann
Films set in the 1840s
Political films based on actual events
Social realism in film
Films about rebellions
German black-and-white films
German historical drama films
1920s historical drama films
1927 drama films
Silent drama films
Silent adventure films
1920s German films